Justin Colfax Morgan (July 8, 1900 – May 24, 1959) was an American lawyer and politician from New York and a United States district judge of the United States District Court for the Western District of New York.

Education and career

Born on July 8, 1900, in Buffalo, New York, Morgan received an Artium Baccalaureus degree from Colgate University in 1921, and a Bachelor of Laws from the University of Buffalo Law School in 1924. He entered private practice in Buffalo in 1925. He was an Assistant United States Attorney for the Western District of New York from 1928 to 1935. He was a councilman of the Town of Tonawanda from 1934 to 1940, and a member of the New York State Assembly from 1941 to 1956, sitting in the 163rd, 164th, 165th, 166th, 167th, 168th, 169th and 170th New York State Legislatures.

Federal judicial service

On January 25, 1956, Morgan was nominated by President Dwight D. Eisenhower to the seat on the United States District Court for the Western District of New York vacated by Judge John Knight. Morgan was confirmed by the United States Senate on March 6, 1956, and received his commission on March 8, 1956. He served in that capacity until his death on May 24, 1959.

References

Sources
 

1900 births
1959 deaths
Judges of the United States District Court for the Western District of New York
United States district court judges appointed by Dwight D. Eisenhower
20th-century American judges
Politicians from Buffalo, New York
Members of the New York State Assembly
Colgate University alumni
University at Buffalo Law School alumni
20th-century American lawyers
Lawyers from Buffalo, New York
Assistant United States Attorneys
20th-century American politicians